Teófimo Andrés López Rivera (born July 30, 1997) is an American professional boxer. He is a former unified lightweight world champion, having held the IBF title from 2019 to November 2021, and the WBA (Super), WBO, and The Ring magazine titles from October 2020 until November 2021. As an amateur, he represented Honduras at the 2016 Summer Olympics. 

As of June 2022, López is ranked as the world's Third best active lightweight by The Ring magazine and the Transnational Boxing Rankings Board, Fourth by BoxRec and fifth by ESPN.

Early life 
López was born to Honduran immigrants on July 30, 1997 in Brooklyn, New York. His paternal grandfather, a Spaniard, was born in 1916 and emigrated to Honduras after the Second World War.  His father, Teófimo López Sr. emigrated to Brooklyn with his mother at age 5. López Sr., started training his son at the age of 6, shortly after moving to Florida.

Amateur career
López won the U.S. Olympic Trials but Carlos Balderas had already secured the United States' sole lightweight entry into the tournament as AIBA's World Series of Boxing champion, so López was aware entering the trials that at best he could only qualify as an alternate for Balderas (who lost in the Olympic quarterfinals). López was able to qualify for the Honduran team, where his parents are from, and reached the finals of the Olympic qualifying tournament for the Americas to earn his place in Rio. López also won the 2015 National Golden Gloves. López competed in the men's lightweight event at the 2016 Summer Olympics representing Honduras, where he was defeated in the tournament by eventual silver medalist Sofiane Oumiha.

Professional career

Early career 
López signed with Top Rank in October 2016, and made his debut on the undercard of the Manny Pacquiao vs. Jessie Vargas fight in November of the same year. After compiling a perfect 10–0 record, he announced himself to the world stage in December 2018 by beating veteran Mason Menard with a knockout of the year candidate. 

In his next fight, López, already ranked #9 by the WBA, #11 by the WBC and #10 by the WBO, faced another boxing veteran in Diego Magdaleno, which ended in another brutal knockout win for López. He attracted some controversy after his exuberant celebration with Magdaleno still down on the canvas. 

López's winning streak continued, improving to 13–0 with a fifth-round knockout victory against former world title challenger Edis Tatli on April 20, 2019 on the undercard of Terence Crawford vs. Amir Khan at Madison Square Garden, New York City.

IBF lightweight champion

López vs. Nakatani 
On July 19, 2019, López who was ranked #4 by the IBF at the time, faced undefeated Masayoshi Nakatani, who was ranked #3, in a final eliminator for the IBF world lightweight title. In the fourth round, López knocked Nakatani down with his right hand, but the referee ruled it a slip. The fight marked the first time López had gone 12 rounds in his career, and he was awarded a unanimous decision victory with scores of 118–110, 118–110, 119–109, setting up a clash with IBF champion Richard Commey.

López vs. Commey 
On December 14, 2019, López challenged the IBF lightweight champion Richard Commey. López won the IBF title in spectacular fashion after connecting on Commey with a big right hand, and finishing him with a second-round technical knockout. After the conclusion of the fight, López was joined in the ring by fellow lightweight champion Vasiliy Lomachenko, with whom he took a photo with. When asked about his plans for his next fight and a possible unification bout with Lomachenko, López replied, "You guys know who I want," referring to Lomachenko without explicitly naming him.

Unified lightweight champion

López vs. Lomachenko 

In September 2020, López agreed to fight unified WBA (Super), WBO, and The Ring champion, Vasiliy Lomachenko, on October 17 at the MGM Grand in Las Vegas. It was the first major fight since the outbreak of the COVID-19 pandemic. With no live audience, López defied the odds with a stunning upset victory as he beat the highly-regarded Ukrainian by unanimous decision to unify the lightweight division and maintain his unbeaten record, with the judges' scorecards reading 116–112, 117–111 and 119–109. The first seven rounds saw López staying behind his jab and going to the body, with his opponent offering very little in response. In the second half, Lomachenko started coming out more offensively, landing more punches. However, in the final round, López landed 50 of 98 punches thrown (51%), the most an opponent has landed on Lomachenko in a round. According to CompuBox stats, Lomachenko landed 141 of 321 thrown (44%), while López landed 183 of 659 thrown (28%).

López declined to give Lomachenko a rematch, explaining that “everybody [in Lomachenko’s camp] was being a dick to me, my father. He [Lomachenko] didn’t want to put a rematch clause in our contract." In the wake of his victory, López asserted that he is the undisputed lightweight champion, despite not holding the WBC belt. However, the claim was contested by many boxing analysts and fans, as the 'Franchise' version of the WBC title won by López against Lomachenko lacks recognition from a large portion of the boxing community, including Devin Haney, recognized by others as the holder of the legitimate WBC lightweight title.

López vs. Kambosos Jr. 

López's first defense of his unified lightweight championship had been scheduled for June 5, 2021 against undefeated contender George Kambosos Jr, before being delayed multiple times due to complications involving López testing positive for COVID-19, and disputes over the venue of the fight. The fight had gone to purse bids which was won by Triller with a winning bid of over US$6 million, leading to a fallout between López and Bob Arum, head promoter at Top Rank. On October 6, it transpired that the IBF had found Triller in default of its contract obligation to stage the fight, and that its rights would be awarded to the second highest bidder, Eddie Hearn's Matchroom, meaning that the fight will be shown live exclusively on the streaming service DAZN. Despite Kambosos entering the bout as a 13 to 1 pre-fight betting underdog, he knocked down the champion in the first round of the fight. Despite returning the favor by knocking down Kambosos in the tenth round, López ultimately lost the bout via split decision. One judge scored the bout 114–113 to López, while the other two judges scored it 115–112 and 115–111 for Kambosos Jr.

Personal life 
On April 23, 2019, López married his wife Cynthia López, who is originally from Nicaragua. They first met on a Delta Air Lines flight from New York City to Las Vegas shortly after López's victorious 9th pro fight against Vitor Jones Freitas, on which Cynthia was a flight attendant. Shortly after marrying, they spent their honeymoon vacation in Greece. 

On February 12, 2021, López used his social media platforms to speak up about injustice and stand in support with victims of racial violence, issuing a message in support of Asian communities around the world in light of Lunar New Year and continued increasing anti-Asian racism in 2021. 

López's native language is English, and he also can understand and speak Spanish.

On June 15, 2021, López tested positive for COVID-19, leading to the postponement of his fight with George Kambosos Jr.

Professional boxing record

See also 
 List of world lightweight boxing champions
 List of WBA world champions
 List of IBF world champions
 List of WBO world champions
 List of The Ring world champions

References

External links
 
 
Teófimo López at Toprank.com
Teófimo López - Profile, News Archive & Current Rankings at Box.Live

1997 births
Living people
Sportspeople from Brooklyn
American people of Honduran descent
Honduran male boxers
Olympic boxers of Honduras
Boxers at the 2016 Summer Olympics
Boxers from New York City
National Golden Gloves champions
Lightweight boxers
International Boxing Federation champions
World Boxing Association champions
World Boxing Organization champions
The Ring (magazine) champions
World lightweight boxing champions